Belle Air Plantation is an estate located on the north bank of the James River in Charles City County, Virginia, United States. It is located along State Route 5, a scenic byway which runs between the independent cities of Richmond and Williamsburg.  Belle Air is listed on the National Register of Historic Places.

Construction
Belle Air is a unique surviving example of a wooden house with postmedieval-style exposed interior timber framing.  It is probably the oldest plantation dwelling along State Route 5. Daniel Clark purchased the Belle Air tract in 1662. The original five-bay portion of Belle Air possesses architectural details characteristic of  seventeenth century construction with a floor plan and façade fenestration characteristic of 18th-century design.  The post medieval-style exposed interior timber framing is the only example found in a frame building in Virginia. The hand-hewn timbers serve as both structural framing and decorative woodwork.  Summer beams, which run through the center of the ceilings into the chimneys, serve as the principal supporting members for the floor joists above. Also on the property are a contributing frame smokehouse with a pyramidal roof, and a frame kitchen.

History
Belle Air remained in the Clark family through the eighteenth century. It was later purchased by Col. William Green Munford, who had served as a colonel in the Continental Army. Inherited by his son, John Munford, at the Colonel's death in 1786, it was sold to John Cocke in 1792. The property was purchased by Hamlin Willcox, a prosperous Charles City County planter, in 1800 and he added the three-bay western portion of the house. The house remained in the Willcox family, which also owned nearby North Bend Plantation at the time of the Civil War, until 1945. Belle Air was restored by the current owner, Mrs. Walter O. Major.

Visitation
The house is open for guided tours during Historic Garden Week and by appointment.

See also

List of James River plantations

References

External links 
Belle Air Plantation - National Park Service, National Register Travel Itinerary
Belle Air Plantation - information from James River Plantation

Houses completed in 1700
James River plantations
Museums in Charles City County, Virginia
Historic house museums in Virginia
Houses on the National Register of Historic Places in Virginia
Houses in Charles City County, Virginia
National Register of Historic Places in Charles City County, Virginia
Plantation houses in Virginia
1700 establishments in Virginia